Anne Parillaud (born 6 May 1960) is a French actress who has been active since 1977. She is best known internationally for playing the title character in Luc Besson's film La Femme Nikita.

Biography
Parillaud was born in Paris. While in school she studied ballet and her ambition was to become a lawyer, but a role during summer vacation – when she was only 16 – in Michel Lang's L'hôtel de la plage (1978) launched her into the world of film. She had a three-year relationship with actor Alain Delon and co-starred with him in his only two films as director, Pour la peau d'un flic (1981) and Le Battant (1983).

She met director Luc Besson and they started a relationship. They married in 1986, but the couple separated shortly after he directed her in La Femme Nikita (1990). La Femme Nikita was an especially intense experience for Parillaud:

After the international success of La Femme Nikita, Parillaud left France to star in three films abroad: Map of the Human Heart, Innocent Blood, and Frankie Starlight. She has said regarding the experience of playing a vampire in John Landis's Innocent Blood:

In 2010 she starred in the French psychological thriller In Their Sleep which was directed by Caroline du Potet and Eric du Potet.

Personal life
Parillaud's first husband was Luc Besson, with whom she has a daughter, Juliette Besson, born in 1987. She became an actress.

In 2005, Parillaud married Jean Michel Jarre. They divorced in 2010.

Selected filmography

Awards
 César Award for Best Actress in 1991 for La Femme Nikita
 David di Donatello Awards for Best Foreign Actress in 1991 for La Femme Nikita
 Paris Film Festival for Best Actress in 2004 for Deadlines
 Tokyo International Film Festival for Special Mention in 1993 for Map of the Human Heart

References

Further reading

External links

 
 
 

1960 births
Living people
Actresses from Paris
French film actresses
French television actresses
Cours Florent alumni
Best Actress César Award winners
David di Donatello winners